The Midnight Sun is an album by organist Jack McDuff recorded between 1963 and 1966 and released on the Prestige label.

Reception
Allmusic awarded the album 3 stars.

Track listing 
All compositions by Jack McDuff except as indicated
 "Love Walked In" (George Gershwin, Ira Gershwin) - 7:52   
 "Misconstrued" - 7:00   
 "The Midnight Sun" (Lionel Hampton, Sonny Burke, Johnny Mercer) - 6:20   
 "Rockabye" (George Benson) - 3:50   
 "Stop It" - 6:09

Personnel 
Jack McDuff - organ
Red Holloway - tenor saxophone (tracks 1-3 & 5)
George Benson (tracks 1-3), Pat Martino (track 5) - guitar
Joe Dukes - drums (tracks 1-3 & 5)
Big band arranged and conducted by Benny Golson (track 4)

References 

Jack McDuff albums
1967 albums
Prestige Records albums
Albums arranged by Benny Golson